Veljko Todorovski (born in 1951) is a retired Macedonian football midfielder.

Club career
Born in Pečkovo, SR Macedonia, he played with Mačva Šabac, Bor and Galenika Zemun. He played mostly in the Yugoslav Second League except one season with Bor in the Yugoslav First League.

References

1951 births
Living people
People from Gostivar Municipality
Macedonian footballers
Yugoslav footballers
Association football midfielders
FK Mačva Šabac players
FK Bor players
FK Zemun players
Yugoslav First League players
Yugoslav Second League players